The Wars of the Roses (1455–1487) was a series of dynastic civil wars fought in Medieval England.

War of the Roses may also refer to:

Other topics
 The War of the Roses (Shakespeare), a modern-day play cycle based on Shakespeare's history plays
 "The War of the Roses" or Roses Match, any game of cricket played between Yorkshire County Cricket Club and Lancashire County Cricket Club, first played in 1849.
 "The War of the Roses", nickname of the 1886 campaign for governor of Tennessee, contested by brothers Alfred A. Taylor and Robert Love Taylor, whose supporters wore red and white roses respectively
 The "War of The Roses", nickname of the Origin Series, rugby league matches between Lancashire and Yorkshire, beginning 1895 
 The War of the Roses (novel), a 1981 novel by Warren Adler
 The War of the Roses (film), a 1989 American film based on the novel
 "War of the Roses", an annual event of The East Kingdom of the Society for Creative Anachronism
 The rivalry between two American minor league baseball teams, the Lancaster Barnstormers and the York Revolution
 War of the Roses (radio show), a live entertainment program, created 1994
 War of the Roses (video game), a 2012 action video game based on the dynastic civil wars

See also
 Wars of the Roses (disambiguation)